American rapper Lil Wayne has released thirteen studio albums, one collaborative album, three compilation albums, five extended plays, and twenty-nine mixtapes. Wayne made his album debut in 1999, with Tha Block Is Hot, which was certified platinum by the Recording Industry Association of America. His later albums, Lights Out released in 2000, and 500 Degreez, released in 2002, attracted minor attention. In 2004, he released the first of his infamous Carter series, with Tha Carter. In 2005, Tha Carter II was released. In 2006, Wayne released a collaborative album with rapper Birdman, titled Like Father, Like Son. In 2008, Wayne released his best-selling album so far, titled Tha Carter III. Certified triple platinum by the RIAA, Tha Carter III won the Best Rap Album award at the 2009 Grammy Awards. Lil Wayne founded record label Young Money Entertainment and released a collaborative album featuring rappers signed to the label, We Are Young Money, in 2009, followed by his debut rock music album Rebirth in 2010. While serving an 8-month prison sentence in New York he released another album entitled I Am Not a Human Being, in September 2010. The next addition to Tha Carter series, Tha Carter IV, was released on August 29, 2011. In 2013, Wayne released a sequel to his 2010 album I Am Not a Human Being, titled I Am Not a Human Being II, followed by two compilation albums with his labels, Rich Gang (2013), and Young Money: Rise of an Empire (2014). After years of legal battles, his 12th studio album Tha Carter V was released on September 28, 2018. Lil Wayne released another album, Funeral, on January 31, 2020.

As of 2018, all of Wayne's albums have been certified gold or higher by the RIAA. His album sales in the United States stand at over 15 million copies as of July 2013, and his digital track sales stand at over 37 million digital copies.

Studio albums

Compilation albums

EPs

Mixtapes

References

External links
 Official website

Hip hop discographies
Discographies of American artists